Pastorale refers to something of a pastoral nature in music, whether in form or in mood.

Pastorale may also refer to:

Pastorale (Stravinsky), a song without words from 1907
Pastorale (album), by Stefano Battaglia, 2009
Pastorale (film), directed by Otar Iosseliani, 1975

See also

Pastoral (disambiguation)
Pastoral Symphony (disambiguation)
Pastourelle, a typically Old French lyric form